is a Japanese video game composer, director, designer, producer, singer, programmer and trombonist, best known for his work in the Pokémon franchise. He was a member of Game Freak where he was an employee and executive at the company since 1989 when he founded it alongside Satoshi Tajiri and Ken Sugimori. In 2022, Masuda was appointed to be Chief Creative Fellow at The Pokémon Company.

With the development of new Pokémon games, Masuda took new roles in future projects. He began to produce and direct games, starting with Pokémon Ruby and Sapphire, and became responsible for approving new character models. His style seeks to keep games accessible while still adding increasing levels of complexity. His work sticks to older mainstays of the series, including a focus on handheld game consoles and 2D graphics. His music draws inspiration from the work of celebrated modern composers like Dmitri Shostakovich, though he used the Super Mario series as a model of good video game composition.

Life
Masuda was born on January 12, 1968, in Yokohama, Kanagawa Prefecture, Japan. As a child, his family often vacationed in Kyūshū, where many of his relatives still live. There he spent his time catching fish and insects, a pastime that later influenced his video game design. Masuda modeled the Pokémon series's Hoenn Region after Kyūshū in an attempt to recapture his memories of summers there. In high school, Masuda played the trombone; he soon discovered classical music, and was drawn in by works like Igor Stravinsky's The Rite of Spring and Shostakovich's Symphony No. 5.

Masuda attended the Japan Electronics College, a technical school in Shinjuku, Tokyo, where he studied computer graphics and the C programming language using a DEC Professional. His daughter Kiri was born in September 2002; he named a character in Pokémon Ruby and Sapphire after her.

Career

Masuda has worked at Game Freak since the company's inception in 1989, and has been involved in nearly every title that Game Freak has produced. Masuda was one of the original developers of the Pokémon series, beginning with Pokémon Red and Green. He was first hired to compose video game music, where his first game at Game Freak was Mendel Palace, a 1989 puzzle game for the Nintendo Entertainment System. After Mendel Palace, he worked on Yoshi, the company's first collaboration with Nintendo.

When the company first began releasing Pokémon titles, Masuda worked mainly as the composer, though he did minor programming work as well, and later began directing and producing them. His work on the first games included writing the program to play audio in the games, music, and sound effects. Masuda has been directly involved in the naming and design of many Pokémon. He has stated that one of the hardest aspects of design is making sure that a Pokémon's name and attributes will appeal to a global audience. Since Pokémon Ruby and Sapphire, Masuda has been one of the main employees who approve or reject designs for new Pokémon. He served as a member of the Game Freak board of directors.

On September 28, 2018, Masuda revealed that during the early years of developing Pokémon games, "game data was nearly lost in a computer crash". Masuda described it as "the most nerve-racking moment in development", saying "We were developing the game on these Unix computer stations called the Sun SPARCstation 1. We’re developing, and they’re these Unix boxes, and they crashed quite a bit."

On November 1, 2018, Masuda stated that Pokémon: Let's Go, Pikachu! and Let's Go, Eevee! would likely be his final time serving as director for the main series Pokémon games. The development torch to was passed to Shigeru Ohmori, who had previously assume lead director of Pokémon Sun and Moon. However afterwards, he served as a director time for Pokémon Brilliant Diamond and Shining Pearl, developed by ILCA.

Masuda produced the Japanese ending themes "Pokémon Shiritori" and "Batsugun Type" for Pokémon Journeys with Japanese electronic group Pasocom Music Club.

On June 1, 2022, Masuda transferred from Game Freak to The Pokémon Company, acting as Chief Creative Fellow.

Influences and style
Masuda approaches each of his games with the mindset that a beginner should be able to easily play it. In view of this, his games begin in an easily approachable and accessible style, with more layers of complexity being introduced as the player progresses through the game. He believes that handheld systems provide an opportunity for social interaction that cannot be found on non-handheld console systems. He has stated that the continued use of 2D computer graphics has been integral to Pokémon's success.

Masuda's musical style draws from a number of sources, particularly classical music and the works of Igor Stravinsky and Dmitri Shostakovich. His favorite musical genre is techno, and he has looked to the music of the Super Mario series as an example of video game music that works well. Most of his ideas draw inspiration from simply observing real life and visualizing how he would design or draw outside objects. As a rule, he does not use previous characters as inspirations for new ones, instead creating each new one from independent sources.

Games

References

1968 births
Japanese composers
Japanese male composers
Japanese trombonists
Japanese video game directors
Japanese video game producers
Japanese video game programmers
Living people
Male trombonists
Musicians from Yokohama
Nintendo people
Pokémon
Video game composers